1996 in Korea may refer to:
1996 in North Korea
1996 in South Korea